Great Peace Shipping Ltd v Tsavliris (International) Ltd [2002] EWCA Civ 1407 (also known as The Great Peace) is a case on English contract law and on maritime salvage. It investigates when a common mistake within a contractual agreement will render it void.

It is notable for its disapproval of Solle v Butcher, a Court of Appeal case wherein Lord Denning established a new doctrine of "equitable mistake".

Facts
The defendants, Tsavliris, were professional salvors in the business of maritime salvage and rendering aid to ships in difficulty in the South Indian Ocean. Learning that a vessel named Cape Providence was in trouble, Tsavliris entered into a salvage agreement with the owners on LOF terms. Tsavliris used the Ocean Routes service to try to locate the nearest rescue vessel, and were told that there was one about 35 miles away called the Great Peace. Using London brokers called Marint, Tsavliris contacted the Great Peace's owners, and agreement was made to hire the tug for a minimum of five days. It then became apparent that the Great Peace was not 35 miles from the Cape Providence, but 410 miles. Tsavliris then found a closer tug and terminated the contract with Great Peace Ltd, who responded by suing for gross breach of contract. Tsavliris argued it was a common mistake as to the location of the stricken vessel and this invalidated the contract.

Judgment
Lord Phillips of Worth Matravers MR  held that the mistake was not sufficiently fundamental to void the contract. The Great Peace would have taken 22 hours to do 410 miles, but that delay was insufficient to make performance of the contract ‘essentially different from those the parties envisaged when the contract was concluded.’

In the course of the judgment, McRae v Commonwealth Disposals Commission, was approved, and Solle v Butcher was disapproved:

See also
English contract law
Frustration in English law
Cooper v Phibbs [1867] UKHL 1, (1867) LR 2 HL 149

Notes

References

English contract case law
Court of Appeal (England and Wales) cases
2002 in case law
2002 in British law